The following is a list of all suspensions and fines enforced in the National Hockey League during the 2010–11 NHL season. It lists which players or coaches of what team have been punished for which offense and the punishment, in the monetary sense of the word, they received.

Suspensions

Fines

See also 
 2010–11 NHL transactions
 2010 NHL Entry Draft
 2010 in sports
 2011 in sports
 List of 2010–11 NHL Three Star Awards

References

Suspension And Fines
National Hockey League suspensions and fines